San Jorge de Alor (Portuguese: São Jorge da Lor) is a village located on the disputed section of the Portugal–Spain border, near Olivenza.

References

Territorial disputes of Spain
Territorial disputes of Portugal